John Nathaniel Vincent, Jr (May 17, 1902 – January 21, 1977) was an American composer, conductor, and music educator.

Vincent was born in Birmingham, Alabama, and studied at the New England Conservatory of Music under Frederick Converse and George Chadwick graduating with a diploma in 1927. He continued his studies at George Peabody College where he earned a bachelors and a master's degree followed by doctoral studies at Harvard University from 1933 to 1935. While at Harvard studying under Walter Piston he won the John Knowles Paine Traveling Fellowship for two years of study with Nadia Boulanger.  He was able to study original manuscripts of all classical composers at Paris Bibliotech Fransaise. After transferring to Cornell University he earned his PhD in 1942.  Made field recordings for Library of Congress with Alan Lomax, using Fairchild machine to preserve notables of the old South. Vincent was head of the music department at Western Kentucky University from 1937 to 1945 and Schoenberg's successor as professor of composition at UCLA, a position he held from 1946 to 1969. He surveyed music schools to create UCLA's state-of-art music building and Schoenberg Hall.

As a composer, Vincent's music is known for its rhythmic vitality and lyricism. Although his music is essentially classical in form it is distinctly individual. The free tonality of his work makes use of what he calls 'paratonality': the predominance of a diatonic element in a polytonal or atonal passage. Vincent wrote numerous orchestral works, chamber music pieces, art songs, and choral works. He also wrote one ballet, 3 Jacks (1942), a film score, Red Cross (1948), and an opera, Primeval Void (1969).

In 1951 his book The Diatonic Modes in Modern Music was published. He also conducted orchestras throughout the US, and all South American countries sponsored by U.S.-State Dept, and he was a director of the Rustic Canyon art-colony Huntington Hartford Foundation from 1952 to 1965. He died in Santa Monica, California in 1977.

Vincent was founding-director of Walt Disney's California Institute of the Arts.

Personal life

Vincent married Amelia Bartlett, violinist, in 1927.  In 1928 he formed the Aeolian Trio with Amelia and Abbie Durkee.  Together they performed recitals in the El Paso area .  Amelia and John lived in Paris from 1935–1936 with their 7-year-old son, Nathaniel. In Paris, Vincent made arrangements to study privately with Boulanger at the Ecole Normale de Musique.  Ruth Kimball, a classmate from Harvard, also attended classes in Paris. During this year, Vincent's marriage with Amelia suffered.  Amelia and their son returned to the United States to live with Vincent's parents.  Amelia and John divorced in 1937.  From June through October, 1936, Vincent traveled by bicycle and motor scooter throughout Europe.  After returning to the United States, Ruth Kimball then became the second Mrs. John Vincent in December 1937. They had two children together, Helen and John .

References
 Marrocco, W. Thomas. 1998. The New Grove Dictionary of Opera, edited by Stanley Sadie. 4 vols. London: Macmillan Press.  and 
 Marrocco, W. Thomas. 2001. "Vincent, John". The New Grove Dictionary of Music and Musicians, second edition, edited by Stanley Sadie and John Tyrrell. London: Macmillan Publishers.

External links
 
 

1902 births
1977 deaths
Musicians from Birmingham, Alabama
New England Conservatory alumni
Harvard University alumni
Cornell University alumni
American male classical composers
American classical composers
American opera composers
Male opera composers
20th-century classical composers
UCLA Herb Alpert School of Music faculty
Western Kentucky University faculty
American male conductors (music)
Pupils of George Whitefield Chadwick
20th-century American composers
20th-century American conductors (music)
20th-century American male musicians